This article contains a list of magazines distributed on cassette, floppy disk, CD-ROM, or DVD-ROM — collectively referred to as disk magazines (or diskmags).

Alphabetical list

A 
 Adventurer (ZX Spectrum, 1995–2004, Russian/English [#14-#15 issues])
El Afghano (IBM PC)
 Alive (Atari ST/Atari Falcon)
 Amber (IBM PC, 1998–1999)
 Amazine (Atari ST, 1992-1993)
 AMnews (Amiga, 1988–1989)
 AnotherMag (IBM PC)
 Apple Talk (Apple)
 Autark (IBM PC, 1996, English/German)

B 
 Bad News (IBM PC, 1994–1996, English/Polish)
 Bain (IBM PC)
 Batsch (IBM PC, 1999, German)
 Beam (IBM PC, 1998–1999)
 Becanne (IBM PC)
 Belgian Scene Report (IBM PC)
 Big Blue Disk was a disk magazine published by Softdisk for IBM PC from 1986.
 Blackmail (IBM PC, 1993–1996, German)
 Budyn (IBM PC, 1996–2001, Polish/English)

C 
 CD Gold (Commodore CD32/CDTV, 1993), commercial release and first known CD-ROM based disk magazine for the Amiga; produced by Goldtech with editorial support from Infinite Frontiers
 CD World (Amiga), titled dedicated to the Amiga CDTV, Amiga CD32 and Amiga CD-ROM systems; produced by Infinite Frontiers)
 Cee-64 Alive! (Commodore 64, relaunched as Commodore Cee (q.v.))
 Ceibe (IBM PC, 1999–2000, Spain)
 Cheese (IBM PC, 1996–1997)
 Chromasette (TRS-80 Color Computer)
 CLI (IBM PC)
 CLOAD was a cassette and disk magazine for the TRS-80 which started in 1978. The magazine ran monthly and provided tapes by subscription. The magazine was named after the command to load a tape into the TRS-80.
 Compute!'s Gazette, originally announced as The Commodore Gazette, was a spinoff of Compute! for the Commodore 64.
 Contrast (IBM PC, 1994–1995)
 CooleR (IBM PC)
 Cows and Snakefights (Amiga)
 Cream (IBM PC)
 CURSOR (Commodore PET, 1978 to early 1980s)
 Cursor 64 (Commodore 64, early 1980s)

D
Daskmig (IBM PC)
Death (IBM PC)
Defcon (IBM PC)
Demojournal (IBM PC)
DemoNews (IBM PC)
Digital Chat (IBM PC)
Digital Talk (Commodore 64)
Disc, The (IBM PC) Beam Software, ca 1995-1996
Disc Station (MSX, PC-9801, Windows 95, 1988–2000)
Disk (Apple II, 1983; business-oriented)
Disk Busters Association (DBA) Diskmagazine (Atari ST/Falcon 030, 1991–1996)
Disk Network (Apple II, c. 1983; geared to programmers)
Disk User (BBC Micro, '80s)
Diskazine (Apple II, 1982; geared to families)
Diskworld (Apple Macintosh, 1988–1993; relaunched as Softdisk for Mac (q.v.))
Domination (Commodore 64)
Dragon (IBM PC)
Driven (Commodore 64, 1994–1995)

E
European Top 20 (Amiga, 1992–1993)
Evil (IBM PC)

F
 Fanzine (Amiga, Spanish)
 Fatum (IBM PC)
 The Final Frontier (Amiga), first disk magazine dedicated solely to Star Trek; produced by Infinite Frontiers
 Flash (IBM PC)
 Fleur (IBM PC)
 Floppyland (IBM PC, 1990s)
 Fluxus (Apple Macintosh Hypercard-based)
 FutureView (Amstrad CPC)

G
 Game On (Commodore 64, 1988–1995)
 Gamer's Edge (IBM PC, 1990–1991)
 Gedan (Amiga, 1994–1995)
 Generation (Amiga)
 Genetic Dreams (Commodore 64, IBM PC)
 Golden Disk 64 (Commodore 64, 1988–1996)
 Grapevine (Amiga, ?–1995)
 GURU (Amiga, ?–?)

H 
 Hacker (IBM PC, 1996–1999, Russian, Croatian)
 Harm (Hellraiser's alternative Russian magazine) (IBM PC)
 Heroin (IBM PC, 1998, English)
 Hoax (IBM PC, 1992–1995, English)
 Hot-Mag (IBM PC, 1994–1995, German)
 Hugi (IBM PC, 1996–present, English, German and Russian)
 Hugi.GER (IBM PC, 2000–2005, German)
 HugiNews (IBM PC, 1998–2000, English)
 Hydrophobia (IBM PC, 1996–1997, Hungarian)

I
I.B.Magazette (IBM PC, 1982–?)
Image (IBM PC)
Imazine (Amiga)
Imphobia (IBM PC)
Incube (IBM PC)
Infinity (IBM PC)
Insomnia (Amiga)

J
Jumpdisk (Amiga)
Jurassic Pack (Amiga)

K
Kelstar (Atari)
Kendermag (IBM PC)
Karmelia (Amiga)

LLano (IBM PC)Launch (Microsoft Windows and Mac OS 7.1 up, late 1990s - early 2000s)Legend (IBM PC)Loadstar (Commodore 64, 1984–2010)Loadstar 128 (Commodore 128)Lookain Fanz (IBM PC)Luna (IBM PC)Lunchtime (Amiga and Acorn Archimedes, 1990–1996)  (#1-Digital Dog Edition; #2 - Hamsters on the Prowl; #3 - Edward's Revenge; #4 - Yul Brynner's Memorial Toolshed; #5 - Wardrobe Racing for Foreigners; #6 - Danger: Unexploded Whippet)

 M 
 The Mag (IBM PC)
 Maggie (Atari ST, 1990-2000)
 Maggie (Atari ST, 1990-1995)
 Magic Disk 64 (Commodore 64, 1987–1993)
 Maniac Magazine (IBM PC)
 Marriage Connection (IBM PC, 1989; computer-aided activities for married couples)
 M*A*R*S (IBM PC)
 McDisk (Amiga)
 Megazin (Amiga)
 Mentor (IBM PC, c. 1983; mostly support programs for business software)
 MicroCode (IBM PC)
 Microzine (Apple II, c. 1983; geared to pre-teens)
 Miggybyte (Amiga, 1995–1997)

NNautilus (Apple Macintosh)New World Order (IBM PC)

O
Obligement (Amiga - diskmag between 1998 and 2005, website only since 2005)The Official Eurochart (Amiga)On Disk Monthly (IBM PC, 1991–1993; relaunched as Softdisk PC (q.v.))Ooze (IBM PC)Overshadow (Commodore 64, 1997–, Hungarian)

 P 
 Pain (IBM PC)
 Parrot (IBM PC)
 PC BusinessDisk (IBM PC, 1990–1991)
 PC Disk (IBM PC, c. 1983; mostly business)
 PC Disk Downunder (IBM PC; Australia/New Zealand adaptation of Big Blue Disk)
 PC Life (IBM PC, 1988)
 Platinum (IBM PC, German)
 Pornograffitti (Commodore 64, 1992-?, Canada)
 Pressure (Amiga)
 The Product (IBM PC)
 Pulse (IBM PC)

Q

RRAW (Amiga)Reality Check Network (IBM PC)Restless (IBM PC)ROM (Amiga)

 S 
 Satanic Rites (Amiga)
 Savage (IBM PC)
 Savage Charts (IBM PC)
 Saxonia (IBM PC)
 The Scene Post (IBM PC)
 Scene World Magazine (Commodore 64, Amiga, 2000–present)
 Scenedicate (Dreamcast, 2005–present)
 Scenial (IBM PC)
 Schwugi (IBM PC)
 Sex'n'Crime was a disk magazine for the demoscene of the Commodore 64 home computer. The magazine was published from 1989 to 1990 by Amok, a label of publisher Genesis Project, and mainly edited by anonymous writer OMG. The successor was titled Propaganda.
 Shine (IBM PC)
 Showtime (Amiga)
 Sinner (IBM PC)
 Skyline (IBM PC)
 Slonecznik (IBM PC)
 Smok (IBM PC)
 Smurffi (IBM PC)
 Sneaker (IBM PC)
 Soap (IBM PC)
 Softdisk (Apple II, 1981–1995)
 Softdisk for Mac (Apple Macintosh, 1993–1998)
 Softdisk for Windows (Microsoft Windows, 1994–1999)
 Softdisk G-S (Apple IIGS, 1989–?)
 Softdisk PC (IBM PC, 1993–1998)
 SoftSide (various platforms, early 1980s; disk/cassette companion to paper magazine)
 Speed (Amiga)
 Splash (IBM PC)
 Static Line (IBM PC)
 Stream CD-ROM Digizine (IBM PC)
 Subkult (IBM PC)
 Subliminal Extacy (ZX Spectrum)
 Suicide (IBM PC, German)
 Sunray (IBM PC)
 Syntax Error (IBM PC)

 T 
 TAP.MAG (IBM PC, 2000–2001, German)
 Terror News (IBM PC, Hungarian)
 Testimony of the Ancients (IBM PC)
 Total Disaster (IBM PC)
 Totem (IBM PC)
 Trashcan (Amiga, 1995–1999, Spanish, English)
 Trip! (IBM PC)
 Trip 2 Hell (IBM PC)

UUndercover Magascene (Atari ST) (merged with Alive Disk Magazine in 2000, but re-animated in 2001)Underground News (Commodore 64 1990-1994 - Canada)Upstream (Amiga)UpTime (various platforms, 1984–1990)El Usuario (IBM PC; Latin American adaptation of Big Blue Disk)

VVagina (IBM PC)Vandalism (Commodore 64)Versus (IBM PC)Vision (Commodore 64, 1993–1996)Vixel (VIC-20, early 1980s)The Voice (IBM PC)v.O.L.V.o (IBM PC)

 W 
 What (IBM PC)
 WildMag (IBM PC, 2000–2001, German)
 Window (Apple II, 1982; educational)
 Worldcharts (IBM PC)
 Wrotki (IBM PC)

XX-Ray (IBM PC)

YYahoo (IBM PC)Yonga (IBM PC)

 Z 
 Zeitenwanderer (IBM PC, German)
 ZINE'' (Amiga, IBM PC from issue #12)

See also
Covermount
List of cassette magazines

References 

 List of disk magazines
Home computer magazines